American Fiction are an American indie rock band formed in Memphis, Tennessee in 2014. The group consists of Chris Johnson (Vocals, Guitar), Landon Moore (Guitar), Patrick Fusco (Keyboards) and Blake Rhea (Bass). They released their debut record, Dumb Luck, on June 3, 2014.  The ten song record was produced, engineered and mixed by Eddie Kramer.

References 

Indie rock musical groups from Tennessee
Musical groups established in 2014
2014 establishments in Tennessee